Derrick Todd Lee (November 5, 1968 – January 21, 2016), also known as The Baton Rouge Serial Killer, was an American serial killer. Between 1992 and 2003, Lee murdered seven women in the Baton Rouge area.

Prior to his murder charges, Lee had been arrested for stalking women and watching them in their homes. Despite this, he was initially overlooked by police, because they incorrectly believed the killer was white. Lee was linked by DNA tests to the deaths of seven women in the Baton Rouge and Lafayette areas in Louisiana, and in 2004 was convicted, in separate trials, of the murders of Geralyn DeSoto and Charlotte Murray Pace. The Pace trial resulted in a death sentence.

Newspapers suggested Lee was responsible for other unsolved murders in the area, but the police lacked DNA evidence to prove these connections. After Lee's arrest, it was discovered that another serial killer, Sean Vincent Gillis, was operating in the Baton Rouge area during the same time as Lee.

Lee died on January 21, 2016, of heart disease at a hospital in Louisiana, where he was transported for treatment from Louisiana State Penitentiary, in which he had been awaiting execution.

Methods
Lee's methods varied with nearly each murder. Similarities between the crimes included the removal of cell phones from the victim's belongings, and a lack of any visible signs of forced entry into the location where the victim was attacked. Two of the victims' bodies were discovered at the Whiskey Bay boat launch, approximately 30 miles west of Baton Rouge, just off Interstate 10.

As a result of an inaccurate FBI offender profile and erroneous eyewitness accounts, police originally believed the killer to be white. Police therefore administered thousands of DNA tests to Caucasian men in and around the general area of the murders. Having no leads, police then allowed the now defunct company DNAPrint Genomics to access DNA left at the crime scenes. DNAPrint Genomics generated an ancestry profile indicating that the suspect was 85% African, thus changing the course of the investigation. Police then knew they were searching for a black man for the January 2002 slaying of Geralyn Barr DeSoto. More specific analysis of the DNA evidence found under the fingernails of DeSoto linked Lee to the 21-year-old Addis, Louisiana woman's death.

Dianne Alexander

Lee entered the St. Martin Parish home of Dianne Alexander on July 9, 2002. Lee beat Alexander severely and attempted to rape her. Dianne Alexander is the only known survivor of Derrick Todd Lee. Alexander survived because her son walked in during the commission of the crime, frightening Lee out of the back of the house. Alexander's son chased Lee through the back of the house and was able to get a description of the car. Alexander had details as to what Lee looked like and on May 22, 2003, Alexander was able to describe Lee to a police sketch artist.

Between the DNA evidence gathered from the deceased victims, a psychological profile made by Mary Ellen O'Toole and the police sketch based on Alexander's description, the police went public with the information. Police in the nearby town of Zachary recognized the man by a recent peeping tom incident they had just investigated. Police in Zachary called the police in Baton Rouge to let them know the name of the suspected perpetrator. Additionally, the Zachary Police Department also let the Baton Rouge Police Department know that they had a DNA sample from Lee due to a prior murder investigation from 6–8 months earlier.  The DNA lab ran and compared the samples and they were a match to Derrick Todd Lee.

Alexander's survival and description of Lee assisted investigators in his arrest. Alexander felt she deserved the Lafayette Crime Stoppers Inc. public reward offering of $100,000 for information leading to the arrest of Lee. On or about August 14, 2003 Alexander contacted Lafayette Crime Stoppers Inc. and inquired about the offer. It was then that Lafayette Crime Stoppers Inc. informed Alexander that she was not eligible to receive the reward.

On February 22, 2006, Alexander hired Attorney L. Clayton Burgess to pursue the case. Lafayette Crime Stoppers Inc. claimed that the reward offer expired on August 1, 2003, and that, although Alexander had gone to the police, she did not contact Lafayette Crime Stoppers Inc. before August 1, 2003. Furthermore, Lafayette Crime Stoppers Inc. claimed that she [Alexander] did not use the tipster hotline and, thereby did not comply with the "form, terms, or conditions" required by Lafayette Crime Stoppers Inc. The case was decided in Lafayette Crime Stoppers Inc.'s favor.

Victims

Once Lee was identified as the primary suspect in these crimes, law enforcement located and captured him in Atlanta, Georgia. Lee waived extradition and was returned to Baton Rouge, where he was tried in August 2004 for the murder of Geralyn DeSoto. Desoto had been found dead in her home in Addis, stabbed numerous times.

DeSoto's husband had initially been the primary suspect in her murder, but as the investigation progressed, DNA evidence linking Lee to the crime had been discovered. Although Lee was eligible for first degree murder charges, the District Attorney elected to try Lee for murder in the second degree because DeSoto had not been sexually assaulted, which meant a first-degree murder conviction would be harder to obtain. Lee was convicted by jury and sentenced to life imprisonment without parole.

There was some argument that Derrick Lee was perhaps incompetent to stand trial. During psychiatric evaluations, he scored an average of 65 on various standardized IQ tests; a score below 69 is considered to be the threshold for what can be considered mental retardation. Lee was, however, deemed fit to stand trial despite his low IQ.

Lee was convicted on October 14, 2004, for the May 31, 2002, rape and murder of LSU graduate student Charlotte Murray Pace. He was sentenced to death via lethal injection. On January 16, 2008, the state Supreme Court upheld the murder conviction and death sentence. Lee was placed on death row at the Louisiana State Penitentiary in Angola. During the manhunt, John Walsh, host of America's Most Wanted, added the Baton Rouge Serial Killer to his Top 10 Fugitives of 2002 at #3.

Lee was portrayed in an episode of the docudrama series Obsession: Dark Desires, which aired in March 2014 and centered on his stalking of surviving victim Collette Dwyer whose tips to police about Todd were not fully followed up.

In addition to the murders of DeSoto and Pace, DNA has linked Lee to five more murders. They were Randi Mebruer, Gina Green, Pam Kinamore, Trineisha Colomb and Carrie Yoder, all of whom were killed between 1998 and 2003.

"Crying baby" rumor
In early 2003, an urban legend began to circulate that Lee was using the taped sounds of a crying baby to lure victims to the door. The Baton Rouge Police were quick to deny that the information was coming from their office. Fueling the rumor were season 3 episodes of the television series Criminal Minds titled "Children of the Dark" and "Tabula Rasa". Lee and the "crying baby" rumor were mentioned in both episodes. 

Snopes reported on this urban legend.

See also 
 List of serial killers in the United States
 List of serial killers by number of victims

References

External links
 "DNA Dragnet", CBSnews.com (multimedia presentation)
 "Louisiana Serial Killer Derrick Todd Lee Loses State Supreme Court Appeal" September 21, 2015
 Derrick Todd Lee  at About.com

1968 births
2016 deaths
African-American people
American people convicted of murder
American prisoners sentenced to death
American rapists
American serial killers
Male serial killers
People convicted of murder by Louisiana
People from St. Francisville, Louisiana
Prisoners sentenced to death by Louisiana
Prisoners who died in Louisiana detention
Serial killers who died in prison custody
Violence against women in the United States